Quinnites is a genus of goniatitid ammonites included in the gastrioceratoidean family Reticuloceratidae known from the Carboniferous of the state of Arkansas, USA.

Description
Quinnites can be recognized by its thickly discoidal shell with a wide umbilicus and double pronged ventral lobe with a median saddle about half as high as the entire lobe. Umbilical ribs are common. May have spiral ornamentation, constrictions, or ventral groove.

Taxonomy
Quinnites, named by  Manger and Saunders 1980, contains two species, Quinnites henbesti  and 
Quinnites textum,  both removed from Gastrioceras (Branneroceras).

References

Goniatitida genera
Reticuloceratidae
Carboniferous ammonites of North America